The 2015–16 Akron Zips men's basketball team represented the University of Akron during the 2015–16 NCAA Division I men's basketball season. The Zips, led by 12th year head coach Keith Dambrot, played their home games at the James A. Rhodes Arena as members of the East Division of the Mid-American Conference. Akron finished the season 26–9, 13–5 record in conference, winning the East Division title as well as the overall regular season MAC championship. The Zips advanced to the championship of the MAC tournament where they lost to Buffalo. As a regular season conference champion who failed to win their conference title, they received an automatic bid to the National Invitation Tournament where they lost to Ohio State in the first round.

Previous season
The Zips finished the 2014–15 season with a 21–14 record, 9–9 in MAC play to finish in fourth place in the East Division. They advanced to the semifinals of the MAC tournament where they lost to Buffalo.

Departures

Incoming Transfers

Recruiting class of 2015

Recruiting class of 2016

Roster

Schedule and results
Source: 

|-
!colspan=9 style="background:#C29C41; color:#000E41;"| Exhibition

|-
!colspan=9 style="background:#C29C41; color:#000E41;"| Non-conference games

|-
!colspan=9 style="background:#C29C41; color:#000E41;"| MAC regular season

|-
!colspan=9 style="background:#C29C41; color:#000E41;"| MAC tournament

|-
!colspan=9 style="background:#C29C41; color:#000E41;"| NIT

References

Akron Zips men's basketball seasons
Akron
Akron